Partie de cartes (also known as Card Game and The Messers. Lumière at Cards (USA), or A Quiet Game of Écarté) is an 1895 French  black-and-white short film directed and produced by Louis Lumière and starring Antoine Féraud.

Plot
Three older men, wearing hats and smoking cigars, are sitting at a patio. Two of the men are playing cards (Écarté) at a table while the third man sits watching. As the game continues a (younger) waiter walks across carrying a tray with a bottle of wine and glasses on it. The man sitting at the table then proceeds to pour the drinks while the waiter observes the card game.

Production
It was filmed by means of the Cinématographe, an all-in-one camera, which also serves as a film projector and developer. As with all early Lumière films, this film was made in a 35 mm format with an aspect ratio of 1.33:1.

The production was shot at Villa du Clos des Plages in La Ciotat, France.

Cast
Antoine Féraud (waiter?)
Antoine Lumière as Man playing cards (uncredited)
Félicien Trewey as Man playing cards to the right (uncredited) 
Alphonse Winckler as Man playing cards (uncredited)

Current status
Given its age, this short film is available to freely download from the Internet. It has also featured in a number of film collections including Landmarks of Early Film volume 1 and The Movies Begin – A Treasury of Early Cinema, 1894–1913.

See also
 Playing Cards, a film and possible remake made the same year

References

External links
Complete Movie on YouTube (note this video forms part of a larger selection of The Lumière Brothers' First Films)
 

1895 films
French black-and-white films
French silent short films
Films directed by Auguste and Louis Lumière
1895 short films
1890s French films
Films shot in France
Films about card games